Irina Crasnoscioc, married Michailova (born August 13, 1981) is a Moldovan-Russian female professional basketball player.

External links
Profile at fiba.com

1981 births
Living people
Sportspeople from Chișinău
Moldovan women's basketball players
Russian women's basketball players
Centers (basketball)